Upsala Simsällskap, the "Uppsala Swimming Society" (but using the old spelling of the city name with one p), was founded in Uppsala in 1796. It is the oldest existing sports club in Sweden and claims to be the oldest swimming club in the world.

The society was founded by the mathematician and astronomer Jöns Svanberg (1771–1851) together with some colleagues at the university as a way to remedy the general lack of swimming skills. The same year the society was founded, Svanberg arranged a mock "graduation ceremony" (promotion), modelled after the academic ceremony, where he and some of his colleagues awarded themselves the master's degree (magister) and their pupils the degree of bachelor (kandidat) in swimming. The simpromotion and these "degrees" were taken over by other Swedish swimming clubs and are still used in Swedish swimming schools.

After Svanberg had temporarily left Uppsala for Stockholm, Gabriel Marklin, otherwise remembered as an eccentric scientific collector, briefly took care of the swimming school, to be succeeded for a few years by Carl Gustaf Grahl, the first professional swimming instructor in Sweden. By that time, Svanberg had returned to Uppsala as professor of mathematics.

In the middle of the 19th century, a bath house was built and later a springboard for diving. The Isander dive (or half gainer), one of the most common dives in springboard diving, was named after Lars Fredrik Isander (1828–1893), active in the Society and later lecturer at the Gymnasium in Linköping, and the Mollberg dive (full gainer) was named after Anders Fredrik Mollberg, swimming instructor for the society (1878–1879), who supposedly invented it by accident when he was actually intending to do an Isander dive. It actually appears to be considerably older and is described already in Underrättelser i simkonsten, a Swedish instruction book in swimming from 1839. Anecdotes describe Mollberg's extraordinary gymnastic ability and how he once made two consecutive "Mollberg" dives while slightly tipsy, leaving spectators wondering how he came out of the water alive.

Although the original intent for the Society was elementary swimming instruction, it entered competitive swimming in 1910 and is one of the most successful swimming clubs in Sweden.

Swimmers
Richard Milton
Sebastian Wikström
Christoffer Wikström
Jennie Johansson

References
Nordisk Familjebok, s.v "Simsällskap" 
Upsala Simsällskap - en historik i fickformat 1 ("Uppsala Swimming Society. A brief history", in Swedish)
About Anders Fredrik Mollberg, Google cache from the website of the Swedish Sports Confederation (Riksidrottsförbundet) (in Swedish)
Nationalencyklopedin, s.v. "Isanderska hoppet", "Mollbergska hoppet", "Upsala Simsällskap" (in Swedish).

External links
Upsala Simsällskap, main page

Upsala SS
1796 establishments in Sweden
Upsala SS
Upsala SS
Clubs and societies in Sweden
Sport in Uppsala
Swimming clubs